Northern Mindanao (Maranao: Pangotaraan Mindanao) is an administrative region in the Philippines, designated as Region X. It comprises five provinces: Bukidnon, Camiguin, Misamis Occidental, Misamis Oriental, and Lanao del Norte,  and two cities classified as highly urbanized, all occupying the north-central part of Mindanao island, and the island-province of Camiguin. The regional center is Cagayan de Oro. Lanao del Norte was transferred to Northern Mindanao from Region XII (then called Central Mindanao) by virtue of Executive Order No. 36 in September 2001.

Etymology
The current name of the region was derived from its position on Mindanao island. The term was officially coined by the Americans after the establishment of American colonial rule in the Philippines due to the defeat of Filipino revolutionaries. There have been proposals to rename the current Northern Mindanao region, which is dominated by the Cebuano ethnic group, into the Amihanan region. Amihanan literally translates to 'northern area' from the Cebuano language, which is the lingua franca of the region.

Geography

More than 60% of Northern Mindanao's total land area are classified as forest land. Its seas abound with fish and other marine products. The abundant vegetation, natural springs and high elevation contribute to the region's cool, mild and invigorating climate.

Administrative divisions

The region is composed of five provinces: Bukidnon, the island province of Camiguin, Lanao del Norte, Misamis Occidental and Misamis Oriental. It has two highly urbanized cities, Cagayan de Oro and Iligan, that are administered independently from any province. The provinces are further subdivided into seven component cities and 84 municipalities, with a total of 2,022 barangays. The regional center is Cagayan de Oro.

Provinces

Governors and vice governors

Component cities

Bukidnon
 Malaybalay
 Valencia

Misamis Occidental
 Oroquieta
 Ozamiz
 Tangub

Misamis Oriental
 El Salvador
 Gingoog

Demographics

Northern Mindanao is the 8th most populous region in the Philippines and 2nd in Mindanao (after Davao Region) according to the 2015 Philippine Statistics Authority Census. The major urban area of Region X is Metro Cagayan de Oro which includes Cagayan de Oro and some municipalities and cities of Misamis Oriental and Bukidnon.

The vast majority of the region's inhabitants descended from migrants from Cebu and Bohol. Some other inhabitants are of Waray, Hiligaynon, Zamboangueño, Maranao and Tausug descent, while the autochthonous Bukidnons and Manobos populate the inner highlands.

The predominant religion is Christianity, with Roman Catholicism forming 72% of the population and Protestants forming a significant minority of 14%. The second predominant religion is Islam, forming 8% of the population.

Economy

The economy of Northern Mindanao is the second largest regional economy in the island of Mindanao. While still a mainly agricultural region, there is also a booming growth of industries particularly in Cagayan de Oro and in Iligan. Del Monte Philippines is located in the Province of Bukidnon and its processing plant is located in Cagayan de Oro, where it ships its products to the rest of the Philippines and Asia-Pacific region. The Agus-IV to VII Hydroelectric Plants in Iligan and Balo-i, Lanao del Norte supply most of its electrical power in Mindanao.

References

External links 
 
 
 

 
Regions of the Philippines